Alfie Hewett and Gordon Reid defeated Stéphane Houdet and Nicolas Peifer in the final, 4–6, 6–4, [10–7] to win the men's doubles wheelchair tennis title at the 2020 Australian Open.

Joachim Gérard and Stefan Olsson were the reigning champions, but Olsson did not participate. Gérard partnered Ben Weekes, but was defeated by Houdet and Peifer in the semifinals.

Seeds

Draw

Bracket

References

External links
 Drawsheet on ausopen.com

Wheelchair Men's Doubles
2020 Men's Doubles